The American College of Medical Informatics consists of elected Fellows that have demonstrated major contributions in biomedical and health informatics, have achieved national recognition in the field, and are committed to advancing the charitable, scientific, literary and educational purposes of informatics for a sustain period of time. Each year, new fellows are elected by the voting members of ACMI. Fellows are elected for life and upon election are named Fellows of ACMI and may use the designation “FACMI”. Those for which the achievements have been documented on Wikipedia are provided below. Each person's name, and election year are given.

Fellows

References

Fellows of learned societies of the United States

Lists of members of learned societies